City Hall Fellows is a non-partisan, non-profit organization that was founded in March 2007 by Bethany Rubin Henderson, a current White House Fellow.

City Hall Fellows places recent college graduates in fellowship positions in local governments across the United States. Fellows work with high-level local officials (typically department heads) and function as full-time staff members in their assigned departments, working on projects and tasks designated by their host city. Fellows each work on an individual project within their assigned department as well as two cohort projects throughout the year. In addition to working on critical city projects, Fellows participate in an intensive and comprehensive Civic Leadership Development Program spanning the entire fellowship term.

City Hall Fellows fellowships are highly competitive, and candidates undergo a rigorous application process. All applicants must submit an application package that includes a cover sheet, four short essay questions, a resume, transcript and recommendation letter. From these packages, a group of finalists are selected who must travel to the appropriate host city for a day-long interview conducted by City Hall fellows and City employees in both group and individual settings. A final cohort is selected after these interviews. In 2009, nearly 500 people applied for 16 slots.

Duration and Locations 
The City Hall Fellows fellowship is a full-time, 12-month position. Fellows are grouped in cohorts of six to ten within each host city. Currently, fellows work for the city of San Francisco, CA. Previously, fellows were also placed in Baton Rouge, Louisiana from 2010-2011, and Houston, TX from 2008-2010.

Civic Leadership Development Program 
Through City Hall Fellows' proprietary Civic Leadership Development Program, Fellows are introduced to the history, organization, and politics of their host city, gain an in-depth understanding of city mechanics (such as the budget process and civil service), tour city facilities, explore public policy issues facing America's cities and dialogue with leading city officials and other policy makers and policy influencers about the mechanics, politics and challenges of local governance. Fellows also complete service projects, including developing policy recommendations for review by senior city officials.

Fellows also spend 2–3 days in their state capital interfacing with state government leaders, and attend a three-day national convention in Washington, D.C.

Awards and recognition
The Case Foundation named City Hall Fellows Executive Director Michael Rocco a 2012 Fearless Changemaker and City Hall Fellows a Fearless Project.
American City & County Magazine named City Hall Fellow's San Francisco Program a 2011 Crown Community for being an innovative and effective public-private partnership.
Babble.com named founder Bethany Rubin Henderson its 2011 Mominee of the Year (Politics) for her work with City Hall Fellows, and awarded $5,000 to City Hall Fellows in her honor.
The New Leaders Council named Bethany Rubin Henderson to its 40 Under 40 list of Progressive Political Entrepreneurs of 2011 for her work with City Hall Fellows.
Baton Rouge Program Director Kathy Fletcher Victorian was named the Foundation for the Mid-South‘s 2010 Louisiana Do-Gooder of the Year for her successes in empowering local citizen leaders.  The Foundation awarded $50,000 to City Hall Fellows in Kathy’s honor.
 City Hall Fellows won the first-ever Coaches’ Award at the Social Innovation Fast Pitch competition in 2009, sponsored by Los Angeles Social Venture Partners.  
City Hall Fellows was selected as one of Echoing Green's fourteen funding ventures in 2009, competing with over 1,000 applicants. 
San Francisco Magazine named City Hall Fellows “Best of the Bay Area 2008″, deeming the program "Best Political Foot in the Door."

References

External links 
 Official site

Charities for young adults
Charities based in California